The 2020 UT Arlington Mavericks baseball team represented the University of Texas at Arlington in the 2020 NCAA Division I baseball season. The Mavericks played their home games at Clay Gould Ballpark and were led by thirteenth year head coach Darin Thomas.

On March 12, the Sun Belt Conference announced the indefinite suspension of all spring athletics, including baseball, due to the increasing risk of the COVID-19 pandemic. Soon after, the Sun Belt cancelled all season and postseason play.

Preseason

Signing Day Recruits

Sun Belt Conference Coaches Poll
The Sun Belt Conference Coaches Poll will be released sometime around January 30, 2020 and the Mavericks were picked to finish first in the West Division and tied for fourth overall in the conference.

Preseason All-Sun Belt Team & Honors
No players from UT Arlington were chosen.

Roster

Coaching staff

Schedule and results

Schedule Source:
*Rankings are based on the team's current ranking in the D1Baseball poll.

References

UT Arlington
UT Arlington Mavericks baseball seasons
UT Arlington Mavericks baseball